William Smith was a Scottish footballer who played for Hibernian as an outside left, although in the last few of the 12 seasons he spent at Easter Road, he was often used at left half after the emergence of Harry Ritchie. Smith played in the 1914 Scottish Cup Final which Hibs lost to Celtic after a replay, and was also selected three times for the Scottish League XI.

References

Year of birth missing
Year of death missing
Scottish footballers
Hibernian F.C. players
Scottish Football League players
Scottish Football League representative players
Preston North End F.C. players
Glasgow United F.C. players
Association football outside forwards
Scottish Junior Football Association players